České dráhy (English: Czech Railways), often shortened to ČD, is the major railway operator in the Czech Republic providing regional and long-distance services.

The company was established in January 1993, shortly after the dissolution of Czechoslovakia, as a successor of the Czechoslovak State Railways. It is a member of the International Railway Union (UIC Country Code for the Czech Republic is 54), Community of European Railways and the Organization for Railway Cooperation (Asia and Europe). With twenty-four thousand employees ČD Group is the fifth largest Czech company by the number of employees.

History
During the 1990s, there was a noticeable drop in railway traffic throughout the Czech Republic, a phenomenon that coincided with a massive expansion in road transport. Seeking to halt, or even partially reverse, this trend, substantial efforts were made to restructure and modernise the railways and their operation. One such measure was the establishment of České dráhy as a joint stock company in January 2003; soon thereafter, various subsidiaries were created that focused on various sectors, such as research, telecommunications, and rolling stock maintenance. Officials were keen to reduce the organisation's losses and to make it a commercially competitive venture, thus numerous reforms were implemented around this time, which included the centralisation of some activities (such as purchasing and internal stocking) while other activities were outsourced to third parties to increase efficiency. There was a general trend towards reducing employee headcount while various new technologies were brought in.

For the second phase of this restructuring, on 1 December 2007, České dráhy spun off its freight operations into the newly established ČD Cargo, which remained a wholly-owned subsidiary of České dráhy. Prior to 1 July 2008, České dráhy was the biggest employer in the Czech Republic. Prior to the late 2000s, the organisation had historically incurred losses as a matter of routine, thus necessitating the provision of subsidies from the Czech government. However, during 2007, České dráhy recorded a profit of 53 million crowns (€2.1 million), which was the first time the company had recorded a profit in its history. Despite this milestone, České dráhy has continued to receive government subsidies and undergo periodic reforms with the aim of cutting costs to become a routinely profitable operating concern.

Measures aimed at increasing operating efficiency have spanned various aspects of the organisation. During January 2008, plans to transfer passenger transport operations to an independent subsidiary were met with approval from the Czech government. While České dráhy is responsible for operating train services, the management and operation of the railway infrastructure (such as the tracks, signals, and stations) is managed by Správa železniční dopravní cesty (SŽDC). During December 2010, the Czech government proposed bringing SŽDC and ČD together in a single holding company. Around this time, the government also changed the subsidy available to both ČD and SŽDC. During 2018, plans were mooted for the privatisation of subsidiary ČD Cargo. However, in November of that year, it was announced that no change would occur and that ČD Cargo would remain a state-owned entity; this was reportedly due to a decision by Andrej Babiš, the Prime Minister of the Czech Republic, to veto the proposal.

During the 2010s, the open-access operator RegioJet has competed directly with České dráhy for passenger patronage between Prague and Ostrava. On 29 September 2011, the latter adopted similar pricing to those charged by RegioJet on the same route, which RegioJet declared to be unfair competition and a misuse of České dráhy's dominant position. Two years later, RegioJet took legal action over České dráhy's pricing policy, alleging its negative impact on its business results. During June 2022, the European Commission claimed that, between 2012 and 2016, České dráhy and the Austrian train operator ÖBB had colluded to prevent RegioJet from obtaining long-distance coaches from the latter.

Modern rolling stock from international manufacturers has been purchases on multiple occasions. Perhaps the most prominent is the ČD Class 680 Pendolino, a high speed tilting train, which was originally intended for operating international services between Berlin, Prague, and Vienna. A successor to the Pendolino was reportedly being sought during the early 2020s; the company has also declared its ambitions to build a dedicated high speed network akin to the TGV. During the 2010s, both České dráhy and freight subsidiary ČD Cargo were operating Siemens Vectron electric locomotives; these have often been leased from other companies. In December 2021, a Koruna 5 billion ($US 225.4m) contract for a further 31 three-car RegioPanter electric multiple units (EMUs) was issued to Skoda Transportation, making for a total fleet size of 110 such trains operated by České dráhy. The company has also explored the use of alternative fuel vehicles.

In 2019, the supervisory board of České dráhy dismissed Miroslav Kupec, chairman of the board of directors, who has been in office since September 2018.

In November 2022, it was announced that Czech plans to subsidise electrified rail operations had been approved by the European Commission, benefitting companies such as České dráhy. That same month, plans were revealed to modernise in excess of 2,000 coaches and other rail vehicles over the next four years at an annual cost of roughly Koruna 3.5bn ($US 142.2m).

Statistics

During 2015, České dráhy recorded that its consolidated revenues were CZK 33 billion. Comprising this figure were revenues from passenger transport, which amounted to CZK 21 billion (64% transfer payments from the government, 24% intrastate transport, 12% international transport), along with revenues from freight transport operated by subsidiary ČD Cargo, which amounted to CZK 11 billion.

168.8 million passengers carried
6,907 million passenger-kilometres
76.723 million tonnes of goods carried
13,592 million tonne-kilometres

History
České dráhy is the result of more than 160 years of railway history in the Czech lands. Historic milestones include:
1828: first horse-drawn railway in continental Europe: České Budějovice - Linz
1839: first steam-hauled railway: Vienna - Břeclav
1903: first standard gauge electrified railway track
1918: foundation of Československé státní dráhy (ČSD or CSD) (English: Czechoslovak state railways)
1991: first EuroCity (EC) trains run on ČSD railways
1993: foundation of České dráhy (ČD or CD) after breakup of Czechoslovakia
1993: started renovation of Pan-European railway corridors
1994: started truck transportation ("RoLa") on ČD railways from Lovosice to Dresden (stopped in 2004)
2003: founding of České dráhy (Czech Railways), joint-stock company
2005: Pendolino tilting trains  enter regular service
2006: The liabilities of ČD Group increased from CZK 19 billion at the end of 2006 to CZK 53 billion at the end of 2015.
2007: freight transport moved into subsidiary company ČD Cargo
2008: creation of ČD Sky, an alliance between České dráhy and the airline SkyEurope. SkyEurope, which was heavily indebted, went bust in August 2009.
2014: first "ČD Railjet" with passengers runs in the Czech Republic

Freight services 

ČD Cargo, the cargo subsidiary, mainly transports raw materials, intermediate goods and containers. As of 2009, it is ranked in the top five largest railway cargo operators in Europe.

Rolling stock 
2,726 tractive vehicles, of which 856 are electric locomotives and train-sets
27,416 freight cars
3,605 passenger cars

See also
Rail transport in the Czech Republic
Transport in the Czech Republic
List of ČD Classes

References

External links

Passenger services
ČD Cargo division
Actual train position

Railway companies of the Czech Republic
Companies based in Prague
Railway companies established in 2003
Czech brands
České dráhy
Government-owned railway companies